Mannoia is a surname. Notable people with the surname include:

Fiorella Mannoia (born 1954), Italian singer
Francesco Marino Mannoia (born 1951), Sicilian Mafioso
Kevin W. Mannoia (born 1955), American theologian
Vincent James Mannoia Jr. (born 1949), American academic administrator

Surnames of Italian origin